Sanjay Mishra (born 6 October 1963) is an Indian actor known for his works predominantly in Hindi cinema and television. Also working for Telugu cinema An alumnus of National School of Drama, he made his acting debut in the 1995 film Oh Darling! Yeh Hai India!. Later films include Rajkumar (1996) and Satya (1998). He also appeared as Apple Singh, an "icon" used by ESPN Star Sports during the 1999 Cricket World Cup. In 2015, he received the Filmfare Award for Best Actor (Critics) for his performance in Ankhon Dekhi.

Early life and background
Sanjay Mishra was born into a Maithil Brahmin family living in Darbhanga, Sakri, Narayanpur, Bihar. Mishra's father Shambhu Nath Mishra was an employee at the Press Information Bureau and both his grandparents were Indian civil servant. When his father got transferred he moved to Varanasi, where he studied in Kendriya Vidyalaya BHU. Mishra joined the National School of Drama and graduated in 1989.

Career

Early career
Mishra did many commercials and small movie roles before he got the opportunity to stand with Amitabh Bachchan in a Mirinda commercial. In 1991, on his first day of shooting the television series Chanakya, he reportedly took 28 takes. The director left him with an assistant director so that he could rehearse for the shoot. His first released movie was Oh Darling! Yeh Hai India! in 1995 in which he played a small part as a harmonium player.

Television actor and comedian
Mishra later acted in Satya and Dil Se.., which helped him in securing the role of Shukla, a corrupt Paan-loving employee, in the famous television sitcom Office Office. In the next few years, he acted mainly in TV serials before moving to films exclusively. He left television serials in 2005 after he got recognition for his role in Bunty Aur Babli and Apna Sapna Money Money.

Mishra is known for his comedic roles, although he has played more serious roles in films such as Zameen, Charas, Plan, and Satya.

Film actor 
In 2006, Mishra acted in and gained fame from the back-to-back hit films Golmaal: Fun Unlimited and Dhamaal. Over the next few years, he appeared in small roles in many multi-starer big banner films before getting nationwide popularity for his role as RGV in All the Best: Fun Begins and Phas Gaye Re Obama. Phas Gaye Re Obama was a serious comedy based on the recession. He directed a movie named Pranaam Walekum, which was released in January 2016, as well as Dhama Choukdhi, which also starred Dipraj Rana and model Rozlyn Khan. Besides working in the Hindi film industry, he has also acted in Bhojpuri cinema. His only Bhojpuri release to date is Rang Li Chunariya Tere Naam.

In 2014, he played the critically acclaimed role of a male protagonist in the film Ankhon Dekhi, directed by Rajat Kapoor. Mishra won the Filmfare Critics Award for Best Actor for his role as Bauji, the protagonist of the film. His dialogue "Dhondu, Just Chill" and comic timing in All the Best gained him wide recognition. His latest release Ankhon Dekhi proved him as a serious actor. His movies Bhoothnath Returns, Kick and Dum Laga Ke Haisha all brought positive reviews. In the year, 2013, he also acted as a leading actor in the film Saare Jahaan Se Mehnga. He has worked mainly in Hindi, as well as Telugu, Bhojpuri, and Punjabi.

His films Prem Ratan Dhan Payo, Dilwale and many small budget films released in 2015, all brought him accolades. During the ICC Cricket World Cup 2015, he did a commercial called Mauka Mauka.

In 2017 he worked in Mangal Ho, Golmaal Again, and Newton movies. Mishra was the lead in the 2017 Hindi-language movie Angrezi Mein Kehte Hain which shows the love story of a mature couple.

Filmography

Television

Director
Pranaam Walekum
Dhama Choukdhi

Other works
He gave his voice for Pumbaa in The Lion King for the Hindi language audio.

Awards and nominations

References

External links

 
 
 
 

1963 births
Living people
Indian male television actors
Indian male film actors
Male actors in Hindi cinema
National School of Drama alumni
20th-century Indian male actors
21st-century Indian male actors
Male actors from Bihar
Kendriya Vidyalaya alumni
People from Saharsa district
Filmfare Awards winners
Screen Awards winners